Kräsuli is an island in the Tallinn Bay, Estonia.

Gallery

See also
List of islands of Estonia

Islands of Estonia
Viimsi Parish